The 2022–23 season is Dinamo București's 74th year in their history and the first played in Liga II. The club will also competed in the Cupa României. The season covers the period from 15 June 2022 to 1 June 2023.

Current squad
Updated last, 20 January 2023

Pre-season friendlies

Mid-season friendlies

Competitions

League II

Regular season

League table

Results summary

Results by matchday

Matches

Play-off

League table

Results summary

Results by matchday

Matches

Cupa României

Squad statistics

Appearances and goals
Players with no appearances are not included on the list.

|-
|colspan="12"|Players sold, released or loaned out during the season:

|}

Disciplinary record

Transfers

Transfers in

Loans in

Loans out

Transfers out

Released

References

Dinamo, București, FC
FC Dinamo București seasons